Malachov is a village and municipality in Banská Bystrica District in the Banská Bystrica Region of central Slovakia.

History
In historical records the village was first mentioned in 1327.

Geography
The municipality lies at an altitude of 505 metres and covers an area of 6.266 km². It has a population of about 918 people.

References

External links
 Obec Malachov

Villages and municipalities in Banská Bystrica District